Ludwigslust-Parchim II – Nordwestmecklenburg II – Landkreis Rostock I is an electoral constituency (German: Wahlkreis) represented in the Bundestag. It elects one member via first-past-the-post voting. Under the current constituency numbering system, it is designated as constituency 13. It is located in western Mecklenburg-Vorpommern, comprising the eastern parts of the districts of Ludwigslust-Parchim and Nordwestmecklenburg, and the northwestern part of Landkreis Rostock.

Ludwigslust-Parchim II – Nordwestmecklenburg II – Landkreis Rostock I was created for the 2002 federal election. Since 2021, it has been represented by Frank Junge of the Social Democratic Party (SPD).

Geography
Ludwigslust-Parchim II – Nordwestmecklenburg II – Landkreis Rostock I is located in western Mecklenburg-Vorpommern. As of the 2021 federal election, it comprises the western parts of Ludwigslust-Parchim district (specifically the municipality of Parchim and the Ämter of Crivitz, Eldenburg Lübz, Goldberg-Mildenitz, Parchimer Umland, Plau am See, and Sternberger Seenlandschaft) and Nordwestmecklenburg (specifically the municipalities of Grevesmühlen, Poel, and Wismar, and the Ämter of Dorf Mecklenburg-Bad Kleinen, Grevesmühlen-Land, Klützer Winkel, Neuburg, and Neukloster-Warin), as well as northwestern parts of Landkreis Rostock (specifically the municipalities of Bad Doberan, Kröpelin, Kühlungsborn, Neubukow, and Satow and the Ämter of Bad Doberan-Land and Neubukow-Salzhaff).

History
Ludwigslust-Parchim II – Nordwestmecklenburg II – Landkreis Rostock I was created in 2002, then known as Wismar – Nordwestmecklenburg – Parchim. It contained parts of the abolished constituencies of Wismar – Gadebusch – Grevesmühlen – Doberan – Bützow, Schwerin – Hagenow, and Güstrow – Sternberg – Lübz – Parchim – Ludwigslust. Until 2013, it was constituency 12 in the numbering system. Originally, it comprised the now-abolished independent city of Wismar, the district of Nordwestmecklenburg, and the now-abolished district of Parchim. In the 2013 election, it lost the Ämter of Gadebusch, Lützow-Lübstorf, Rehna, and Schönberger Land from the Nordwestmecklenburg district, while it gained northwestern parts of Landkreis Rostock; it also acquired its current name and constituency number.

Members
The constituency was held by the Social Democratic Party (SPD) from its creation in 2002 until 2009, during which time it was represented by Iris Hoffmann. It was won by the Christian Democratic Union (CDU) in 2009, and represented by Karin Strenz. She was re-elected in 2013 and 2017. Frank Junge won the constituency for the SPD In 2021.

Election results

2021 election

2017 election

2013 election

2009 election

References

Federal electoral districts in Mecklenburg-Western Pomerania
2013 establishments in Germany
Constituencies established in 2013